Vas o No Vas is the name of Deal or No Deal used in a few Spanish-speaking countries, including:
Vas o No Vas (Mexican game show)
Vas o No Vas (American game show)
Vas O No Vas (Peruvian game show)